Solomon Glass (March 8, 1893 – March 7, 1973), of Baltimore, Maryland, was a philatelist who was recognized as a foremost expert in United States postage stamps of the 20th century.

Philatelic literature
Glass is known for his books United States Postage Stamps 1945–1952, published in 1954, and The Story of United Nations Postage Stamps, which was published in 1953 and subsequently re-issued as an official United Nations publication.

Philatelic activity
Glass' philatelic activities were international. At the Fédération Internationale de Philatélie, he was its first American member of the Executive Board (1955).  Glass was active in a number of philatelic organizations, including, the American Philatelic Society (Board of Vice-Presidents), American Philatelic Congress, and at the Bureau Issues Association, which is now renamed the United States Stamp Society.

At the Baltimore Philatelic Society, Glass served in a number of capacities, including president.

Honors and awards
Glass received the Benjamin Franklin Award for Distinguished and Outstanding Public Service and the Luff Award in 1954 for Distinguished Philatelic Research. In 1966 he received the Medal for Distinguished Service from the Fédération Internationale de Philatélie, and in 1974 was named to the American Philatelic Society Hall of Fame.

See also
 Philately
 Philatelic literature

References

1893 births
1973 deaths
Philatelic literature
American philatelists
People from Baltimore
American Philatelic Society